Oak Knoll is the southernmost neighborhood in Pasadena, California. It is bordered by Oak Knoll Circle to the north, Old Mill Road to the south, South Oak Knoll Avenue and South Oakland Avenue to the west, and the San Marino border (Kewen Drive and Encino Drive) to the east.

The eponymous knoll is a 150 ft-high ridge formed by the Raymond Fault.

An upscale neighborhood on rolling, oak-covered terrain, it was developed in 1905 by a corporate partnership between prominent Northeastern United States and California residents A. Kingsley Macomber, Henry E. Huntington and William R. Staats.

Education
Oak Knoll is served by Allendale Elementary School, Hamilton Elementary School, McKinley School and Blair High School.

Culture

Historical estates
Robert R. Blacker House, designed by Charles and Henry Greene
Cordelia A. Culbertson House, designed by Charles and Henry Greene
Spinks House, designed by Henry Greene
Huntington Hotel, designed by Charles Frederick Whittlesey and Myron Hunt

Transportation
Oak Knoll was served by Metro Local line 258 until December 18, 2020, when service was discontinued due to low ridership in the area.

Government
Oak Knoll is part of Pasadena City Council District 7, represented by Andy Wilson.

References

Hough, S (2004).  Finding Fault in California: An Earthquake Tourist's Guide, Mountain Press Publishing Company.

Neighborhoods in Pasadena, California
1905 establishments in California